List of Kereta Api Indonesia rolling stock classes. All are for 3 ft 6 in gauge railways unless otherwise stated. This list includes both operational and withdrawn classes.

Steam locomotives

Operational
Reference

Diesel locomotives
Reference

3 ft 6 in gauge

750 mm gauge

Internal combustion multiple units

Diesel multiple units

Hydraulic transmission 
Reference

Electric transmission 
Reference

Gasoline multiple units 
Operated before independence, all withdrawn (presumably scrapped)

Electric locomotives
All electric locomotives have been replaced by electric multiple units.System: 1.5 kV DC overhead, unless stated.

Electric multiple units
Reference

3 ft 6 in gauge rollingstock
System: 1.5 kV DC overhead & 750 V third rail

Standard gauge rollingstock
System: 25 kV AC overhead & 750 V third rail

Passenger coaches

References

External links 
 Steam Locomotive Roster, Page 1
 Preserved Steam Locomotives

Locomotives of Indonesia
Indonesian Railways
Kereta Api